Lasia is a genus of small-headed flies in the family Acroceridae. There are about 19 described species in Lasia, which are distributed in the New World.

Species
These 19 species belong to the genus Lasia:

 Lasia aenea Rondani, 1863 – Chile
 Lasia auricoma Westwood, 1848 – Brazil
 Lasia colei Aldrich, 1927 – Costa Rica
 Lasia corvina Erichson, 1840 c g – Chile
 Lasia cuprea Rondani, 1863 – Chile
 Lasia ecuadorensis Bequaert, 1931 c g – Ecuador
 Lasia klettii Osten Sacken, 1875 i – United States (Arizona)
 Lasia metallica Rondani, 1863 c g – Chile
 Lasia nigritarsis (Blanchard, 1852) c g – Chile
 Lasia ocelliger (Wiedemann, 1830) c g – Brazil
 Lasia pulla (Philippi, 1865) c g – Chile
 Lasia purpurata Bequaert, 1933 i b (purple small-headed fly) – United States (Arkansas, Oklahoma, Texas)
 Lasia rostrata Aldrich, 1927 c g – Costa Rica
 Lasia rufa (Philippi, 1865) c g – Chile
 Lasia rufipes Westwood, 1848 c g – Brazil
 Lasia rufovestita (Blanchard, 1852) c g – Chile
 Lasia scribae Osten Sacken, 1887 – Guatemala
 Lasia splendens Wiedemann, 1824 c g – Brazil
 Lasia yucatanensis Bequaert, 1931 – Mexico (Yucatán)

Synonyms:
 Lasia aenea (Philippi, 1865) c g: synonym of Lasia aenea Rondani, 1863
 Lasia nigripes (Philippi, 1865) c g: synonym of Lasia cuprea Rondani, 1863

Data sources: i = ITIS, c = Catalogue of Life, g = GBIF, b = Bugguide.net

References

Further reading

 

Acroceridae
Articles created by Qbugbot
Nemestrinoidea genera
Diptera of North America
Diptera of South America
Taxa named by Christian Rudolph Wilhelm Wiedemann